The 2016 FIBA 3x3 World Tour is the 5th season of the FIBA 3x3 World Tour, the highest professional 3x3 basketball competition in the World. The tournament is organized by FIBA.

The World Tour Final was held in Abu Dhabi, United Arab Emirates at the International Tennis Complex of the Zayed Sports City. Team Ljubljana of Slovenia were the champions, who defeated Team Hamamatsu of Japan in the final.

Finals qualification
Seven Masters tournaments were held in seven cities in seven countries. The finals were held in Abu Dhabi, United Arab Emirates. The best team from each stop qualified as well as the best teams in the overall ranking.

Group stage

Group A

Group B

Group C

Group D

Second round

Final standing

References

External links 
 Official website

FIBA 3x3 World Tour seasons
World Tour